{{Infobox settlement
| official_name                   = Torwarsak
| name                            = 
| settlement_type                 = Union Council
| image_skyline                   = Torwarsak village.jpg
| imagesize                       = 
| image_alt                       = 
| image_caption                   = TORWARSAK VILLAGE IN 2020
| image_blank_emblem              = 
| blank_emblem_size               = 100px
| blank_emblem_type               = Logo
| blank_emblem_link               = 
| image_map                       = 
| mapsize                         = 280px
| map_alt                         = 
| map_caption                     = 
| image_map1                      = 
| mapsize1                        = 
| map_alt1                        = 
| map_caption1                    = Location within Pakistan
| subdivision_type                = Country
| subdivision_name                = Pakistan
| subdivision_type1               = Province
| subdivision_name1               = Khyber Pakhtunkhwa
| subdivision_type2               = District
| subdivision_name2               = Buner
| population_total                = 35,165
| population_as_of                = 2018
| population_est                  = 
| pop_est_as_of                   = 
| population_footnotes            = 
| area_total_km2                  = 
| leader_title                    = Chairman 
| leader_name                     = Maulana Zia Ur Rahman / village 1
| leader_title1                   = Chairman 
| leader_name1                    = Bakht Faraz / village 2
| blank_name_sec1                 = Number of towns
| blank_info_sec1                 = Village Council Torwarsak 1
Village Council Torwarsak 2
| blank_name_sec2                 = Number of Union Councils
| blank_info_sec2                 = 1 Union Council Torwarsak  UCT| timezone1                       = PST
| utc_offset1                     = +5
| website                         = 
| native_name                     = تورورسک
| area_code                       = 560
| postal_code                     = 19270
| native_name_lang                = Pashto
| postal_code_type                = Postal code Torwarsak
| translit_lang1_type1            = Main language
| translit_lang1_info1            = Pashto
}}
 
thumb|Jangdara Torwarsak

The Torwarsak''' area of Pakistan is an "administrative unit", known as the Union council of Buner District, located in the Khyber Pakhtunkhwa province of Pakistan.

District Buner has six Tehsils, usually translated as townships. These are Daggar, Chagharzai, Chamla, Totalai, Gagra, and Gadezai. Each tehsil comprises a certain number of union councils. There are 27 union councils in Buner District.

Torwarsak is the most populated union council in Buner. Torwarsak is also known as a religious Town in Buner for Tabligh e Markaz.

Etymology
Torwarsak has two main units, Yakhail and Khadenkhail. Each of these consist of five sub-units.

Yahkhail comprises Shani, Kotwal, Babar, Musakhel, Sath Khel, and Mula Khel.

Khadenkhail comprises Wastakhail, Chor Hwaidad, Maghwale Ibrakhan, Baba tal, and Sargental.

Notable people
Fazli Ghafoor (Politician)
Bakht Jehan Khan (Former speaker of Khyber Pakhtunkhwa)
Darwish Khan (social worker)

Education
Government Primary School shnai Torwarsak
Government Middle School shnai Torwarsak
Buner Public School Shnai Torwarsak
Government Primary School Ali Sher Torwarsak
Usmania College shnai Torwarsak
Buner Education Academy Torwarsak
Government girls Primary School Torwarsak
Al-Khalid Public School Torwarsak
Aftab Public School
Usmania School & College
Government Higher Secondary School Torwarsak
Government High School Torwarsak
Carvaan Learning Academy and Hostel Torwarsak
The Bright Nation School Torwarsak

Hospitals
Buner children Hospital Shnai Torwarsak
BHU shnai Torwarsak
 Dr.Mirza Jehan clinic shnai Torwarsak
Azeem medical complex Torwarsak
Dr.fazal wahab Clinic Torwarsak

Sports
Kala cricket ground shnai Torwarsak
Fazal cricket ground kas Torwarsak
Markaz ground Torwarsak
United cricket ground Shnai Torwarsak

See also 

 Buner District

References

External links

United Nations
Hajjinfo.org Uploads
PBS paiman.jsi.com

Buner District
Populated places in Buner District
Union councils of Khyber Pakhtunkhwa
Union Councils of Buner District